William Henry Dawson, 1st Viscount Carlow (died 22 August 1779) was an Anglo-Irish politician and peer.

Dawson was the son of Ephraim Dawson of Queen's County and Anne Preston, daughter and heiress of Samuel Preston. 

Between 1733 and 1760, Dawson was a Member of Parliament for Portarlington in the Irish House of Commons. In 1761 he was elected to represent Queen's County, which he did until 1768. He then sat for Portarlington again between 1769 and 1770. On 29 May 1770 he was raised to the peerage as Baron Dawson of Dawson's Court in the Peerage of Ireland, and Dawson assumed his seat in the Irish House of Lords. On 24 July 1776 he was further honoured when he was made Viscount Carlow, also in the Peerage of Ireland. Between 1750 and his death, Dawson was a Governor of Queen's County.

On 8 December 1737, he married Mary Damer, daughter of Joseph Damer and sister of Joseph Damer, 1st Earl of Dorchester. They had five sons and three daughters. Dawson was succeeded in his title by his eldest son, John Dawson.

References

|-

Year of birth unknown
1779 deaths
18th-century Anglo-Irish people
Irish MPs 1727–1760
Irish MPs 1761–1768
Irish MPs 1769–1776
Lord-Lieutenants of Queen's County
Members of the Irish House of Lords
Members of the Parliament of Ireland (pre-1801) for Portarlington
Members of the Parliament of Ireland (pre-1801) for Queen's County constituencies
Viscounts in the Peerage of Ireland